The Universitatea Națională de Educație Fizică și Sport  (UNEFS), is one of the highest-profile higher education institutions in Romania, and was founded on 1 December 1922, in Bucharest. It was the tenth institution of its kind in the world and the fifth in Europe.

UNEFS is one of the major physical education and sport institutions in Eastern Europe, and the degrees are awarded by the Ministry of National Education, and are recognised by other countries with whom bilateral agreements have been signed.

Alumni

Other notable alumni
 Laura Badea – fencer, coach and sport administrator
 Mariana Bitang – gymnastics coach and political counselor
 Dan Grecu – gymnast and coach
 Marius Urzică – gymnast and coach
 Marian Drăgulescu – gymnast
 Iolanda Balaș –  athlete, high jumper, and former president of the Romanian Athletics Federation and IAAF commissioner
 Anișoara Cușmir – athlete, long jumper, and coach
 Doina Melinte – athlete, runner, and former vice president of the Romanian Anti-Doping Agency and director of the National Agency for Youth and Sport
 Argentina Menis – athlete, discus thrower
 Violeta Beclea-Szekely – athlete, runner 
 Sanda Toma – rower and professor
 Marioara Popescu – rower
 Nicolae Țaga – rower
 Elisabeta Lipă – most decorated rower in the history of the Olympics, president of the Romanian Rowing Federation, and former president of CS Dinamo București and politician 
 Toma Simionov – sprint canoer
 Vasile Pușcașu – Greco-Roman wrestler  
 Ion Draica – Greco-Roman wrestler, businessperson, and former politician, president of Romanian Federation of Wrestling and SSC Farul Constanța president 
 Gheorghe Berceanu – Greco-Roman wrestler and coach
 Mihaela Buzărnescu – tennis player
 Ion Motroc - Former Professional football player

External links 
  

National Institutes of Sport
Sport in Romania
UNEFS
Sports academies
Educational institutions established in 1922
1922 establishments in Romania